The 2018–19 season was the 120th season in Associazione Calcio Milan's history and their 85th (108th overall) in the top-flight of Italian football. Milan competed in Serie A, the Coppa Italia, the UEFA Europa League and the Supercoppa Italiana.

Milan qualified for the 2018–19 UEFA Europa League group stage as the sixth-placed team of the previous season, but were originally banned by UEFA from European competition due to violations of Financial Fair Play regulations for failure to break-even. On , Li Yonghong failed to keep up with his loan repayment plan, neglecting to deposit a €32 million installment on time in order to keep refinancing the €303 million loan debt owed to Elliott Management Corporation. As a result, ownership of the club was immediately transferred to the American hedge fund. In the summer of 2018, Leonardo returned to Milan as a sporting director, while the club's hall of fame player Paolo Maldini was hired for the first time as a sporting strategy and development director. In September 2018, the club hired a new CEO, Ivan Gazidis, who had previously worked with Arsenal for over a decade and began his work with Milan on 1 December 2018.

Once again, the club failed to achieve its primary objective of qualifying for the Champions League, either through winning the Europa League (Milan suffered a group stage elimination), or finishing in the top 4 of the national league competition, i.e. Serie A. On 28 May 2019, following an unsatisfactory result, both Leonardo and Gennaro Gattuso announced their resignations, with the latter donating his entire €5,5 million severance package back to the club.

Having taken a week to contemplate his future, on 14 June 2019 Maldini assumed the role of a technical director responsible for the "planning and development of the club's sporting area". On the same day, another club legend Zvonimir Boban was appointed Chief Football Officer, overseeing the club's sporting area.

Players

Squad information

.

Transfers

Summer window

In

On loan

Loan returns

Total spending: €102.50M + Undisclosed + Bonuses (€4.00M)

Out

Loans ended

Loans out

Total income: €87.75M + Undisclosed

Winter window

In

On loan

Total spending: €70.40M + Undisclosed

Out

Loans out

Loans ended

Total income: € 1,60M + Undisclosed

Pre-season and friendlies

Friendlies

International Champions Cup

Trofeo Santiago Bernabéu

Competitions

Supercoppa Italiana

Serie A

League table

Results summary

Results by round

Matches

Coppa Italia

UEFA Europa League

Group stage

Statistics

Appearances and goals

|-
! colspan=14 style=background:#dcdcdc; text-align:center| Goalkeepers

|-
! colspan=14 style=background:#dcdcdc; text-align:center| Defenders

|-
! colspan=14 style=background:#dcdcdc; text-align:center| Midfielders

|-
! colspan=14 style=background:#dcdcdc; text-align:center| Forwards

|-
! colspan=14 style=background:#dcdcdc; text-align:center| Other

|-
! colspan=14 style=background:#dcdcdc; text-align:center| Players transferred out during the season

Goalscorers

Players in italics left the team during the season.

Assist

Players in italics left the team during the season.

Clean sheets

Disciplinary record

Players in italics left the team during the season.

References

A.C. Milan seasons
Milan
Milan